The North Devon Journal is a weekly newspaper published in Barnstaple, North Devon.

History
The newspaper was established in 1824 by Lex Scott, a local bookseller. It cost 7d. until 1836, when the price was reduced to 4d. For a short time in 1870 the paper was published daily, with a second edition to provide news of the Franco-Prussian War. That year there was competition with the establishment of the liberal North Devon Herald. Both papers survived until 1941, when they merged as the North Devon Journal Herald. In 1986 the paper changed from broadsheet to tabloid format, and became the North Devon Journal again.

In 2012, Local World acquired owner Northcliffe Media from Daily Mail and General Trust. Local World was subsequently acquired by Trinity Mirror.

5,914 issues of the North Devon Journal, from between 1824 and 1950, are available to read in digitised form at the British Newspaper Archive.

References

External links
 North Devon Journal website

Publications established in 1824
Newspapers published in Devon
North Devon